IJDB may refer to:

 International Journal of Developmental Biology, a scientific journal in biology
 The Internet Juggling Database (not active anymore)
 Internet Jokes Database, a collection of funny jokes to share and laugh